Louisiana Delta Community College is a public community college in Monroe, Louisiana. 

The college began offering classes in 2001. Louisiana Delta Community College has eight campuses (Bastrop, Jonesboro, Lake Providence, Monroe, West Monroe, Winnsboro, Ruston, Tallulah) throughout northeast Louisiana. The college offers associate degrees, technical diplomas, professional certifications, and dual enrollment for high school students.

References

External links
Official website

Community colleges in Louisiana
Educational institutions established in 2001
Universities and colleges accredited by the Southern Association of Colleges and Schools
Education in Ouachita Parish, Louisiana
Buildings and structures in Monroe, Louisiana
2001 establishments in Louisiana